SS Junipero Serra was a Liberty ship built in the United States during World War II. The ship was operated by the War Shipping Administration. In 1959, the ship was scrapped in Seattle, meeting the same fate as most other Liberty ships.

Career 

Junipero Serra was laid down on 20 May 1942 as Yard Number 292 by the California Shipbuilding Corporation (Calship) in Los Angeles. The ship was launched on 30 June 1942 and was completed on 12 July 1942. The ship, named after the Spanish priest and missionary Junípero Serra y Ferrer, was Calship's 42nd Liberty ship completed. It took 41 days to complete, surpassing Calship's previous record of quickest Liberty ship built by 18 days; the previous record was held by the SS Joseph McKenna.

For World War II she was operated by Sudden & Christenson Company for the United States Maritime Commission. She was built under the Emergency Shipbuilding program. United States Navy Armed Guard manned the deck guns.

The ship was scrapped in February 1959 in Seattle.

References

Citations

Bibliography 

Liberty ships
1942 ships
Ships built in Los Angeles